The 2021–22 Brighton & Hove Albion W.F.C. season was the club's 31st season in existence and their fourth in the FA Women's Super League, the highest level of the football pyramid. Along with competing in the WSL, the club also contested two domestic cup competitions: the FA Cup and the League Cup.

Summary

Brighton only played two pre-season matches where they came away without a win after a 6–1 away loss at Everton, but a respectable 1–1 draw against Manchester United being played in Loughborough.

The Seagulls opening match of the 2021–22 season was played at Falmer Stadium where they came out on top winning 2–0 over West Ham with a penalty from Inessa Kaagman and Lee Geum-min adding the second, pouncing on The Hammers poor defence, in front of a crowd of 2,264. A week later, Brighton thrashed Birmingham City in a 5–0 away victory to take them top of the WSL table after the second round of matches. Brighton's first loss of the season came in their third match in a 1–0 home loss to Aston Villa on 26 September. The Seagulls ended Tottenham Hotspur's 100% winning start of the season on 10 October, after winning 2–1 at home with goals from Lee Geum-min and Victoria Williams to take Brighton up to fifth.

On 31 October, Brighton were beaten 3–0 away at Arsenal in the semi-final of the 2020–21 FA Cup, which was delayed from the previous season due to the COVID-19 pandemic.

The Seagulls returned to Falmer Stadium on 14 November, where Maisie Symonds scored a 90+3rd-minute winner, the only goal of the game in the 1–0 win over Leicester City, their third league victory on the bounce.

Brighton were knocked out of the League Cup in the group stage after losing 3–0 away at West Ham on 15 December. Their fixture against Arsenal four days later was postponed due to growing fears of Covid–19 cases. 

After not playing since 12 December, the Seagulls were thrashed via Manchester City's second half blitz in the 6–0 home thumping loss on 9 January 2022. After four consecutive defeats, Brighton were able to keep a clean sheet and take a point in the 0–0 home draw against defending league champions Chelsea on 23 January, but still go five games without a goal. Four days later The Seagulls finally scored ​their first goal since 14 November, with Emma Koivisto scoring the opener away at Arsenal, however they went on to lose 2–1. 

Three days later, Brighton were knocked out by Reading in the FA Cup fourth round in the thrilling 3–2 home loss where Emma Koivisto scored her second goal in as many games. Brighton won their first match since 14 November, to end a nine match winless run in all competitions, by beating Reading 4–1 at home on 13 February, with Kayleigh Green netting a hat-trick and Koivisto netting her fourth of the season.

Squad

Preseason

Competitions

Overview

FA Women's Super League

Results summary

Results by matchday

Results

League table

Women's FA Cup

As a member of the first tier, Brighton will enter the FA Cup in the fourth round proper.

FA Women's League Cup

Group stage

Transfers

Transfers in

Loans in

Transfers out

Loans out

Squad statistics

Appearances 

Starting appearances are listed first, followed by substitute appearances after the + symbol where applicable.

|-
! colspan=14 style=background:#dcdcdc; text-align:center|Goalkeepers

|-
! colspan=14 style=background:#dcdcdc; text-align:center|Defenders

  
|-
! colspan=14   style=background:#dcdcdc; text-align:center|Midfielders                 

|-                                
! colspan=14 style=background:#dcdcdc; text-align:center|Forwards

|-
|colspan="14"|Players away from the club on loan:

|-
|colspan="14"|Players who appeared for the club but left during the season:

|}

Note

Katie Robinson joined Women's Championship side Charlton Athletic on 27 January 2022 on loan until the end of the season.

Rinsola Babajide's loan spell expired during the season.

References 

Brighton & Hove Albion W.F.C. seasons
Brighton and Hove Albion